Shakir  is a sub-district located in Arhab District, Sana'a Governorate, Yemen. Shakir  had a population of 8568 according to the 2004 census.

References 

Sub-districts in Arhab District